Vivir Así (English Living Like This) is the 19th studio album by Mexican pop singer Mijares. It was produced by Scott Erickson. The title song ”Vivir Así”, written by Camilo Sesto, was released as single. Mijares had signed with Warner Music México.

Album content
All 13 tracks are cover versions in Spanish of popular songs. It includes duets with pop singers Ricardo Arjona, Daniela Romo, Pandora and Fela.

Track listing
 Vivir así
 Mentira
 Si tú supieras
 Mujeres (with Arjona)
 Como te amé
 Vuelve
 Hasta que me olvides (with Fela)
 Quien piensa en ti
 Para ti yo estoy (with Daniela Romo & Pandora)
 Puede ser genial
 Uno dos tres
 Vivir sin aire
 You are so beautiful

Covered Singers
 Vivir así by Camilo Sesto
 Mentira by Valeria Lynch & Hernaldo Zúñiga
 Si tú supieras Alejandro Fernández
 Mujeres by Ricardo Arjona
 Como te amé by Dionne Warwick, Yuri
 Vuelve by Ricky Martin
 Hasta que me olvides by Luis Miguel
 Quien piensa en ti by Gonzalo
 Para ti yo estoy by Dionne Warwick, Gladys Knight, Elton John & Stevie Wonder
 Puede ser genial by Pandora
 Uno dos tres by Brian McKnight
 Vivir sin aire by Maná
 You Are So Beautiful by Joe Cocker

Reference list

2009 albums
Manuel Mijares albums
Covers albums